Donovan Tildesley (born July 24, 1984) is a retired blind Canadian swimmer. He was the flag bearer of Canada at the 2008 Paralympic Games.

Swimming career

He started swimming at the age of nine. Until 2000, he had swum in many provincial and national competitions, setting many Canadian records.

He is the current world record holder for the 800-metre freestyle and the 1500-metre freestyle.

Personal life and education

Tildesley graduated from the University of British Columbia in spring 2008 with an English degree Donovan works full-time as an insurance broker for Buntain Insurance Agencies in Vancouver. He also does public speaking and is a co-owner of a small radio station in Whistler, British Columbia. In May 2021, during the COVID-19 pandemic in British Columbia, Tildesley advocated for blind British Columbians to be given vaccine priority similar to vulnerable groups with other medical conditions.

References

External links
His profile at the Canadian Paralympic Committee

1984 births
Living people
Paralympic swimmers of Canada
Swimmers at the 2000 Summer Paralympics
Swimmers at the 2004 Summer Paralympics
Swimmers at the 2008 Summer Paralympics
Paralympic silver medalists for Canada
Paralympic bronze medalists for Canada
Swimmers from Vancouver
World record holders in paralympic swimming
Paralympic swimmers with a vision impairment
University of British Columbia alumni
Medalists at the 2000 Summer Paralympics
Medalists at the 2004 Summer Paralympics
Medalists at the 2008 Summer Paralympics
S11-classified Paralympic swimmers
St. George's School (Vancouver) alumni
Paralympic medalists in swimming
Canadian male medley swimmers
Canadian male freestyle swimmers
Canadian male butterfly swimmers
Canadian blind people